The Birinchi May District (First of May) is a district of the capital city of Bishkek in northern Kyrgyzstan. Its resident population was 171,467 in 2009. It covers the city centre and the northwestern part of the city.

Demographics

Ethnic composition
According to the 2009 Census, the ethnic composition (residential population) of the Birinchi May District was:

References 

Districts of Kyrgyzstan
Bishkek